Regelia cymbifolia is a plant in the myrtle family, Myrtaceae and is endemic to the south-west of Western Australia. It is a much branched shrub bearing tiny, wedge shaped leaves and clusters of deep pink to purple flowers on the ends of its branches in spring.

Description
The leaves are arranged in alternating pairs (decussate), so that they make four rows along the stems.

The flowers are deep pink to purple and arranged in small clusters on the ends of branches that continue to grow after flowering. There are 5 sepals, 5 petals and 5 bundles of stamens. Flowering occurs between August and November and is followed by fruit which are woody capsules.

Taxonomy and naming
Regelia cymbifolia was first formally described in 1905 by Ludwig Diels in Botanische Jahrbücher für Systematik, Pflanzengeschichte und Pflanzengeographie and tentatively given the name Beaufortia ? cymbifolia. In 1964, Charles Gardner recognised the specimen as Regelia cymbifolia in Journal of the Royal Society of Western Australia. The specific epithet (cymbifolia) is from the Latin cymba meaning "a boat" and -folius meaning "leaved".

Distribution and habitat
Regelia cymbifolia occurs in a restricted area near the Stirling Range in the Avon Wheatbelt, Esperance Plains and Jarrah Forest biogeographic regions. It grows in sand on undulating plains.

Conservation
Regelia cymbifolia is classified as "Priority Four" by the Western Australian Government Department of Parks and Wildlife meaning that it is rare or near threatened.

Use in horticulture
Regelia cymbifolia is not well known in cultivation but has been grown in Kings Park.

References

cymbifolia
Myrtales of Australia
Plants described in 1964
Endemic flora of Western Australia